Wat Pa Phu Kon is a Buddhist Temple located in Udon Thani, Thailand. The temple serves as a place of pilgrimage for practitioners of the Buddhist faith.

History 

The Wat Pa Phu Kon temple complex was built between 2010 and 2013. The construction cost 320 million Thai baht, with the funds used for construction being donated by a Thai donor in honor of King Bhumibol Adulyadej. The complex is centered around the Great Wihan, the largest component of the temple. In addition, a number of smaller buildings are located around the complex. One of the most notable features of the temple is a 65 foot long statue of a reclining Buddha. Said statue was built with white marble blocks imported from Italy and then sculpted in Thailand. The temple also features a 25 meter high golden stupa.

References 

Buddhist temples in Udon Thani Province